Lee Eun-Byul (born October 2, 1991) is a South Korean short track speed skater. She won the silver medal at the 2008 World Junior Championships in Bolzano. She also finished in second place in the 1500m speed skating at the 2010 Winter Olympics in Vancouver, British Columbia, Canada.

Career highlights

Winter Olympic Games - Short Track Speed Skating
2010 - Vancouver,  2nd place
ISU World Junior Short Track Speed Skating Championships
2008 - Bolzano,  2nd overall classification

References

External links
ISU profile
2008 ISU World Junior Championships, Italy

1991 births
Living people
South Korean female speed skaters
South Korean female short track speed skaters
Olympic short track speed skaters of South Korea
Olympic silver medalists for South Korea
Olympic medalists in short track speed skating
Short track speed skaters at the 2010 Winter Olympics
Medalists at the 2010 Winter Olympics
Universiade medalists in short track speed skating
World Short Track Speed Skating Championships medalists
Universiade gold medalists for South Korea
Universiade silver medalists for South Korea
Universiade bronze medalists for South Korea
Competitors at the 2011 Winter Universiade
Competitors at the 2013 Winter Universiade
Competitors at the 2015 Winter Universiade
21st-century South Korean women